Police Call may refer to:
 Police Call (TV series), a 1955 American anthology television series
 Police Call (film), a 1933 Pre-code American crime drama film